Hai'an, originally named Zhen'an, was a wooden steam powered frigate built for the Imperial Chinese Navy. They were the largest vessels built in China until the 1930s; they each ran over budget and used sub-standard building materials which limited their use. Hai'an was initially used as a training ship, and later saw action in the Sino-French War as a potential blockship, being scrapped as a hulk following the war.

Design
She was constructed at the dockyard at the Kiangnan Arsenal for the Imperial Chinese Navy's Nanyang Fleet. Hai'an and her sister ship  were the largest vessels built in China until the cruiser  in 1931. She was also equipped with a sailing rig across her three masts. She had a crew complement of 372.

Her armament initially consisted of two  muzzle-loading rifles (MLRs) mounted on the upper deck and 24 70-pounder Whitworth naval guns, the latter mounted in broadsides. During a later overhaul these were subsequently replaced Krupp guns of varying sizes, with two  guns placed on the upper deck, and the broadside replaced with four  and 20  guns. Hai'an was built at a cost of 355,190 taels; the cost of Hai'an and Yuyuen exceeded the budget and resulted in their limited use initially. Furthermore, due to the use of low quality pine from Oregon and Vancouver in the construction of the vessels meant that the timbers were showing obvious signs of rot after a few months of use.

Career
Hai'an was launched on 24 May 1872 from the Kiangnan Arsenal, ahead of her sister ship 19 months later. The cost of the two ships meant that Yuyuen was not initially manned as there was not sufficient funds remaining to pay for her crew. Meanwhile, Hai'an spent the majority of her early life as a training vessel. Both Hai'an-class frigates were known for being unseaworthy.

During the Sino-French War, Hai'an was prepared to be used as a blockship should the French Navy attempt to attack Shanghai. She was filled with stones and towed out to the bar of the Whangpoo (now Huangpu) river. As this attack did not occur, she was towed back into Shanghai after the end of the war, and was disposed of as a hulk within a few years.

Notes

References

 

1872 ships
Naval ships of China
Ships built in China
Sino-French War naval ships
Naval ships of Imperial China
Frigates